Nicole Anne Zapanta Tiamzon (born November 3, 1995) is a Filipina professional volleyball player.

Personal life
Tiamzon, a Taytay, Rizal-native volleybelle started playing when she was 10, and started competing in her second year of high school in Siena College of Taytay. She tried out for the Lady Maroons volleyball team of the University of the Philippines and got accepted. She graduated with a degree in Sports Science.

Advocacy
Tiamzon founded the Spike and Serve in 2017, a non-profit grassroots volleyball development program where they teach the underprivileged kids to play volleyball, and organizing community-based leagues where they can compete.

Clubs
  Foton Tornadoes (2015)
  Perlas Spikers (2017-2021)
  Petro Gazz Angels (2022-)

Awards

Individual
  2019 Premier Volleyball League Reinforced Conference "1st Best Outside Spiker"

Club
 2018 Premier Volleyball League Reinforced Conference -  Bronze medal, with BanKo Perlas Spikers
 2018 Premier Volleyball League Open Conference -  Bronze medal, with BanKo Perlas Spikers
 2018 Vietnam Vinh Long Television Cup -  Bronze medal, with the BanKo Perlas Spikers
 2019 Premier Volleyball League Open Conference -  Bronze medal, with BanKo Perlas Spikers
 2022 Premier Volleyball League Reinforced Conference -  Gold medal, with Petro Gazz Angels

References

1995 births
Living people
Filipino women's volleyball players
University Athletic Association of the Philippines volleyball players
Outside hitters